Muhammed Sagar Ali (born 13 April 1993) is an Indian professional footballer who plays as a centre-back. He most recently played for Bhutan Super League club FC Takin.

Playing career

Sagar Ali began his youth career when he was a ninth standard student. He attended the sub-junior state football championship for Idukki in 2007. He spent majority of his youth career at Sports Authority of India, Kollam. Sagar Ali started his professional career by playing for Air India FC 2015. A year later, Sagar Ali signed with Delhi United FC. His next stint was with Madhya Bharat FC where he played for the club in the I League second division.

In 2018 he was signed by United SC to represent them in the Calcutta Football League. Later he signed with ARA FC and played in the 2018–19 I league second division.  In 2019, Sagar Ali signed a short-term contract with the Bhutan Premier League club Druk Stars FC. In 2020, he returned to ARA FC after his contract expired with the Bhutanese club. He played for the ARA FC in the I league qualifiers. During this time he was spotted by Gujarat and received an invitation to represent them in the 2021-22 Santosh Trophy. He was appointed as the team's captain and helped the side to qualify for the final round of the Santosh Trophy for the first time in 37 years. In 2022, Sagar Ali made his second move to Bhutan. He signed a one-year contract with FC Takin, the new entrants in the Bhutan Super League.

Career statistics

See also
 List of Indian expatriate footballers

References

1993 births
Living people
Indian footballers
Association football defenders
Indian expatriate footballers